Yosef Baratz (born 8 May 1890, died 14 December 1968) was a Zionist activist and Israeli politician.

Biography
Born in Coșnița, a village in Kherson Governorate in the Russian Empire (today in the Dubăsari District of Moldova), Baratz was educated at a heder and joined the Young Zion movement in Chișinău. He immigrated to Ottoman-controlled Palestine in 1906, and worked in agriculture in Petah Tikva and Rehovot, and as a stone cutter in Jerusalem, Tel Aviv, Atlit and Zikhron Ya'akov. In 1920, Baratz was also amongst the early members of Degania Alef, the first kibbutz.

Baratz was also sent abroad as an emissary, to Russia in 1919, the United States in 1921 and Austria in 1934. He became a member of the central committee of the Haganah, and was also a member of the Assembly of Representatives.
In 1949, he was elected to the first Knesset on the Mapai list, but lost his seat in the 1951 elections. He died in 1968 at the age of 78.

References

External links

1890 births
1968 deaths
People from Dubăsari District
People from Tiraspolsky Uyezd
Moldovan Jews
Jews from the Russian Empire
Emigrants from the Russian Empire to the Ottoman Empire
Jews in Ottoman Palestine
Jews in Mandatory Palestine
Israeli people of Moldovan-Jewish descent
Mapai politicians
Members of the Assembly of Representatives (Mandatory Palestine)
Members of the 1st Knesset (1949–1951)
Haganah members